Cryptarius truncatus, the spoonsnouted catfish, is a species of sea catfish from estuaries and lower courses of rivers from the Chao Phraya to Sumatra and Java, including the lower Mekong. It inhabits brackish waters of Thailand, Cambodia, Indonesia, and Malaysia. This fish species feeds on fishes and crustaceans. It is caught for human consumption.

References

Ariidae
Fish of Asia
Fish described in 1840